The MSU Exponent is the student newspaper of Montana State University – Bozeman since 1895. It is printed weekly on Thursdays during the academic year schedule and distributed on and around the university campus for free. The newspaper is divided into news, sports and outdoors, culture, and opinion.

Location 
The MSU Exponent office is located on the third floor of the Student Union Building (SUB) in Room 366.

Former Titles 
The MSU student newspaper has been known by a number of names during its history.

 College Exponent (1895-1901)
 The Exponent (1901-1910)
 Weekly Exponent (1910-1931)
 Montana Exponent (1931-1960)
 Exponent of Montana State College (1960-1965)
 Exponent of Montana State University (1965-1976)
 MSU Exponent (1976-1981)
 The Exponent (1981-1987)
 ASMSU Exponent (1987-2012)
 MSU Exponent (2012–present)

Digital Archives 
A partnership between the Exponent and the Montana State University library has made copies of the newspaper dating back to 1895 available online.

References

External links 

Student newspapers published in Montana
1895 establishments in Montana